Marcos Pérez may refer to:
Marcos Pérez Jiménez (1914-2001), Venezuelan politician
Marcos Pérez Esquer (born 1970), Mexican politician
Marcos Pérez (born 1989), Spanish footballer
Marcos Pérez (born 1993), Argentine footballer

See also
Marco Pérez (disambiguation)
Markus Perez (born 1990), Brazilian mixed martial artist